Defence Secretariat 19 (DS19) was a special unit set up within the British Ministry of Defence by Michael Heseltine in March 1983. Its purpose was to combat the Campaign for Nuclear Disarmament (CND) and all calls for unilateral nuclear disarmament.

References

See also 
 Women and Families for Defence

Ministry of Defence (United Kingdom)
Politics of the United Kingdom
Cold War
Nuclear organizations
Anti–nuclear weapons movement